Conversations is a 1972 album showcasing three jazz drummers Buddy Rich, Louie Bellson, and Kenny Clare with the Bobby Lamb - Ray Premru Orchestra.

Track listing 
LP side 1:
"Round And Round And Round Again" (Ray Premru) 
"Just Louie" (Bellson) – Louie Bellson drum solo
"Son Of Cuchulainn" (Bobby Lamb) 
LP side 2:
"Conversations With B.L.K." (Bobby Lamb)

Personnel 
Buddy Rich – drums on "Son of Cuchulainn" and "Conversations with B.L.K"
Louie Bellson – drums on "Just Louie" and "Conversations with B.L.K"
Kenny Clare – drums on "Round and Round and Round Again" and "Conversations with B.L.K"
The Bobby Lamb – Ray Premru Orchestra
Greg Bowen, Derek Watkins, Stan Reynolds, Ronnie Hughes, John McLeavy – trumpets
Cliff Hardie, Keith Christie, John Marshall, Jack Thirlwall, Bobby Lamb, Ray Premru – trombones
Nick Busch, Colin Horton, John Pigneguy, Tony Lucas, Nick Hill – French horns
John Jenkins – tuba 
Duncan Lamont, Jim Philip – tenor saxophones
Ronnie Chamberlain, Alan Branscombe – alto saxophones 
Ken Dryden – baritone saxophone 
Steve Gray – piano
Arthur Watts – bass 
Tristan Fry – percussion

References 

EMI/Parlophone PCS 7151
Vocalion CDLK 4436 (CD re-issue packaged together with Repercussion by Louie Bellson and Eric Delaney)

Buddy Rich albums
Louie Bellson albums
1972 albums
Collaborative albums